This is a list of kings of Pontus, an ancient Hellenistic kingdom of Persian origin in Asia Minor.

Kings of Pontus

Mithridates I Ktistes 281–266 BC
Ariobarzanes 266 – c. 250 BC
Mithridates II c. 250 – c. 220 BC
Mithridates III c. 220 – c. 185 BC
Pharnaces I c. 185 – c. 170 BC
Mithridates IV Philopator Philadephos c. 170 – c. 150 BC
Mithridates V Euergetes c. 150 – 120 BC
Mithridates VI Eupator 120–63 BC
Pharnaces II 63–47 BC
Darius of Pontus 39–37 BC
Arsaces of Pontus 37 BC
Polemon I 37–8 BC
Pythodorida (Queen) 8 BC – 38 AD
Polemon II 38–62 AD

Pontus